Laura Ioana Paar and Julia Wachaczyk were the defending champions but lost in the quarterfinals to Viktória Kužmová and Arantxa Rus.

Kužmová and Rus went on to win the title, defeating Eugenie Bouchard and Olga Danilović in the final, 3–6, 7–5, [10–7].

Seeds

Draw

Draw

References

External Links
Main Draw

Lyon Open (WTA) – Doubles
Lyon Open (WTA)